This is a list of Michelin starred restaurants in Guangzhou, capital of Guangdong Province, China. The 2018 edition was the first edition of the Michelin Guide to Guangzhou to be published.

List of restaurants

2021 - 2030

2018 - 2020

See also
 List of Michelin starred restaurants in Hong Kong and Macau
 List of Michelin starred restaurants in Shanghai
 List of Michelin starred restaurants in Taipei
 List of Michelin starred restaurants in Beijing
 List of Michelin starred restaurants in Chengdu

References

External links
 Guangzhou Michelin Restaurants - the Michelin Guide - ViaMichelin

Michelin Guide starred restaurants in China
Food- and drink-related lists
Guangzhou